German ultimatum may refer to:

 1939 German ultimatum to Lithuania
 1939 German ultimatum to Poland
 Godesberg Memorandum, 1938 German ultimatum to Czechoslovakia